Cucumis maderaspatanus is a species of plant in the family Cucurbitaceae. The species is found throughout the tropics and subtropics, from west Africa to Australia. One of its many synonyms is Mukia maderaspatana.

References 

maderaspatanus
Flora of Australia
Flora of Africa
Flora of Asia